Apache Woman is a 1976 Italian Spaghetti Western film, written and directed by Giorgio Mariuzzo.

Cast 
 Al Cliver as Tommy
 Clara Hopf as  Sunsirahè 
 Corrado Olmi as  Honest Jeremy
 Federico Boido as  Keith
 Stefano Oppedisano as  Frankie
 Mario Maranzana as  Snake
 Pietro Mazzinghi as The Preacher Masters 
 Ely Galleani as The Preacher's Daughter

References

External links
 

1976 films
1976 Western (genre) films
Italian Western (genre) films
Spaghetti Western films
1970s Italian-language films
1970s Italian films